Shmuel M. Tamir (born Shmuel Katznelson; 10 March 1923 – 29 June 1987) was a prominent Israeli independence fighter, lawyer, patriot and Knesset member.  After a successful career fighting the British he entered the Knesset from 1965 to 1980, rising to become Minister of Justice in the government of Menachem Begin from 1977 until 1980.  Tamir was an ardent anti-Nazi leading proactive legal cases to prosecute perpetrators of the Holocaust and war criminals. Tamir's maverick politics finally led him into an independent politician after several attempts of coalition with nationalist right-wing parties.

Biography
Born in Jerusalem, Shmuel was the son of Reuven Katznelson (a member of the Jewish Legion and Joseph Trumpeldor's sergeant and comrade in the Battle of Gallipoli) and Batsheva Katznelson (a member of the Knesset). Two of his uncles were Joseph Katznelson, a companion of Ze'ev Jabotinsky and one of the Irgun's two Chiefs of Illegal Immigration and Avraham Katznelson, one of the signatories of the Israeli declaration of independence, and his aunt was Rachel Katznelson-Shazar, wife of Zalman Shazar, the third President of Israel.

Irgun activism
Shmuel joined Etzel in 1938 and after the declaration of the Revolt in February 1944, and took part in operations against British targets, most notably the 26 February 1944 attack on income tax offices in Jerusalem. In 1944 he was a commander of the Jerusalem District and commanded the operation that blew up the Income Tax offices in the city; Commander of Intelligence in Jerusalem District.  During 1946 he served as Deputy Commander of the Jerusalem District and was in charge of the Irgun Intelligence unit in Jerusalem.

He was arrested by the British several times, and in March 1947 was exiled to Detention Camps in Kenya where he finished his Law studies.  In the camp he served as the Supervisor who represented the detainees to the British Authorities.

Legal and political career

Katzenelson returned home with the last exiles from Kenya on 12 July 1948, after Israeli independence was declared; upon arriving in Israel, he adopted his code name, Tamir (meaning "tall and slender") as his legal name.  He had a notable career as a lawyer and conducted several famous political cases, including the Yedidya Segal and Rudolf Kastner trials.

He was one of the founders of Menachem Begin's Herut party, but left in 1952.  One of the founders of the "New Regime" in 1957 after the Suez Crisis, he returned to the party in 1964, and in 1965 was elected to the Knesset on the Gahal list.

In 1966 he was expelled from the party for trying to promote an abortion bill through the Knesset. So together with two others, he formed the Free Centre in 1967.  Tamir was re-elected in 1969, and again in 1973, by which time his party had merged into Likud.  He resigned from the Knesset in January 1977 to form the Shinui Party, which failed and very soon broke up.  Immediately afterwards he decided to join the new centrist party, the Democratic Movement for Change (Dash).  He was returned to the Knesset in the 1977 elections on Dash's list, and was appointed Minister of Justice in the Begin government on 24 October.  As Dash disintegrated, Tamir joined the Democratic Movement, before leaving to sit as an independent MK (member of the Knesset). He resigned from the cabinet on 5 August 1980 when his party was frozen out of coalition decision-making.  At the ensuing 1981 election he lot his seat.  

Tamir was a supporter of far-right Rabbi Meir Kahane and the Jewish Defense League.

References

Further reading
 
 
 
 
 
 
 

1923 births
1987 deaths
People from Jerusalem
Israeli people of Ukrainian-Jewish descent
Irgun members
Gahal politicians
Herut politicians
Free Centre politicians
Likud politicians
Democratic Movement for Change politicians
Democratic Movement (Israel) politicians
Ministers of Justice of Israel
Members of the 6th Knesset (1965–1969)
Members of the 7th Knesset (1969–1974)
Members of the 8th Knesset (1974–1977)
Members of the 9th Knesset (1977–1981)